Guaraguaoonops is a genus of spiders in the family Oonopidae. It was first described in 2012 by Brescovit, Rheims & Bonaldo. , it contains 2 species, both from Brazil.

References

Oonopidae
Araneomorphae genera
Spiders of Brazil